Australian Geographic is a media business that produces the Australian Geographic magazine, DMag magazine, specialist book titles, travel guides, diaries and calendars and online media. It published editions of the Australian Encyclopaedia. It previously operated the Australian Geographic retail chain stores and Australian Geographic Travel and Australian Geographic Adventures.

Australian Geographic magazine, originally titled Dick Smith's Australian Geographic, is a bi-monthly geographical journal created by Dick Smith in 1986. The magazine focuses mainly on stories about Australia, or about Australian people in other countries. The six editions published each year are available by subscription and on newsstands. They include posters or sheet maps in each edition, as well as photographs and detailed technical illustrations.

Australian Geographic also has a website that includes the entire magazine digital archive.

Each year, a portion of the profits is provided to the Australian Geographic Society.

History
The Australian Geographic magazine, originally titled Dick Smith's Australian Geographic, was initially published by Australian Geographic Pty Ltd, a private company controlled by Dick Smith, the founder of Dick Smith Electronics and Dick Smith Foods.  His name was removed from the title two years later. Australian Geographic Pty Ltd also operated the Australian Geographic chain of retail stores. The publication's offices were originally based in Terrey Hills north of Sydney. Smith wanted the publication to focus on accuracy by exclusively including articles that were peer-reviewed. Australian Geographic acquired rights to the Australian Encyclopaedia and published editions in 1988 and 1996. In 1995, when subscriptions totalled more than 200,000, Smith sold the business to Fairfax Media for A$41 million.

In December 1998, the business was bought out by its management.

From September 2000 to December 2001, Australian Geographic published a bimonthly science and technology magazine known as Newton Graphic Science. There were, however, only eight issues published before the magazine went permanently out of print.

In November 2006, PBL Media's ACP Magazines (now Bauer Media Group) purchased the Australian Geographic publishing division. The Australian Geographic magazine was then based at Park Street, Sydney. The editor-in-chief of Australian Geographic was Chrissie Goldrick, while the editor was John Pickrell.

In September 2007, Australian Geographic Retail, which operates an online store and retail stores selling products including Australiana, weather stations, telescopes, books and toys, was sold separate to the publication business. From 2007 to 2016 Australian Geographic Retail was owned by Myer Family Investments but after large operating losses it was sold in August 2016 to The Co-op, a retail supplier to universities. The license ended in 2019.

In 2018, the publication was sold to Sydney-based Northern Pictures, a television production company owned by Blue Ant Media.

Awards
The Australian Geographic Society Adventure Award has been awarded since 1987 and is Australia's longest-running award for adventure. It is judged on merit and therefore not all of the categories are awarded annually. The award ceremony, attended in 2018 by the Duke and Duchess of Sussex, is a celebration of achievement and is not a competition. The award is given in two categories – Adventurer of the Year, and Young Adventurer of the Year.

Adventurer of the Year

Young Adventurer of the Year

See also

 Geographic magazine

References

 Australian Geographic 10th Anniversary Collectors Edition No. 40 Oct – Dec 1995

External links
 Australian Geographic

1986 establishments in Australia
Bi-monthly magazines published in Australia
Geographic magazines
Local interest magazines
Magazines established in 1986
Magazines published in Sydney
Quarterly magazines published in Australia
Blue Ant Media